The Men's triple jump F46 event for amputee athletes was held at the 2004 Summer Paralympics in the Athens Olympic Stadium. It was won by Anton Skachkov, representing .

24 Sept. 2004, 19:00

References

M